Canadian Authors is a Canadian biographical television series which aired on CBC Television in 1978.

Premise
Episodes of this series featured various Canadian authors and were produced at various CBC facilities throughout Canada.

Production
 Halifax: Harry J. Boyle, Alden Nowlan
 Montreal: Margaret Atwood, Michel Carneau, Jacques Godbout, Mordecai Richler, Yves Thériault, Hugh MacLennan
 Ottawa: David Helwig, Naim Kattan, Blaise Mukherjee, Dorothy O'Connell
 St. John's: Harold Horwood, Joey Smallwood
 Toronto: Carol Bolt, Robertson Davies, Marion Engel, Sylvia Fraser, Tom Hendry
 Vancouver: Barry Broadfoot, James Clavell, Jack Hodgins, Susan Musgrave
 Winnipeg: Heather Robertson, Ken Mitchell, Robert Kroetsch, Dorothy Livesay

Scheduling
This half-hour series was broadcast from Monday to Thursday at 2:30 p.m. from 1 November to 21 December 1978.

References

External links
 

CBC Television original programming
1978 Canadian television series debuts
1978 Canadian television series endings